Massimo Ranieri (born Giovanni Calone on 3 May 1951) is an Italian singer, actor, television presenter and director.

Biography

Early life
Ranieri was born in Naples (at Santa Lucia), the fifth of eight children in the family. When he was 10, young Giovanni would sing at restaurants, wedding receptions, etc. He was discovered by a music producer about four years later and was flown to New York to record an EP under the name of Gianni Rock.

Singing career
Ranieri recorded four songs in 1964: Tanti auguri signora, Se mi aspetti stasera, Non chiudere la porta, and La Prima Volta. None of the records were successful, primarily because young Gianni's voice was changing. Two years later, he would re-emerge under his new stage name, Massimo Ranieri. In 1966, he made his TV debut singing "Bene Mio". A year later, he made another TV appearance singing, "Pietà per chi ti ama". In 1968, he recorded two more songs: "Da Bambino", Ma L'amore cos'è" and "Preghiera".

It was not until 1969 when he achieved success and became a teen idol when he sang "O Sole Mio" on live TV. That same year, he had a string of hits: "Rita", "Se bruciasse la citta", "Quando l'amore diventa poesia", "Il mio amore resta sempre", "Rose rosse" and "Zingara". In 1970, "Vent'anni", "Sogno d'amore", "Sei l'amore mio", "Aranjuez Amore Mio", and "Candida".

In 1971, Ranieri recorded the songs "Adagio Veneziano", "Via del Conservatorio", and "Io e Te". He represented Italy in the 1971 Eurovision Song Contest in Dublin, Ireland, where he placed 5th with the song "L'Amore E' Un Attimo. " In 1972, he released the songs "Ti Ruberei", "O Surdato 'nnamurato", and "Erba di Casa Mia"; in 1973, "Amo Ancora Lei". He returned to the Eurovision Song Contest that year, in Luxembourg, to represent Italy with "Chi sarà con te", where he placed 13th. In 1974, came the singles "Te Voglio Bene Assaie", "Immagina", and "Per Una Donna".

In 1988, he made a comeback to his singing career with the song, "Perdere l'amore", which won the Sanremo Festival, that year. In 1997, he made another comeback with "Ti parlerò d'amore".

In February 2007, he started a concert tour of Italy, titled "Canto perché non-so nuotare...da 40 anni" which lasted for more than two years, with more than 500 shows, was made into a CD and a DVD, which went platinum.

In 2022, he won the Mia Martini critics award at Sanremo Festival.

Acting career
In 1970, Ranieri decided to venture into acting. His screen debut, Metello received rave reviews from critics, and won him the David DiDonatello award for best actor for portraying the title character. He co-starred with Anna Magnani in the television film La Sciantosa later that year.

In 1974, he filmed Salvo D'Acquisto, where he portrayed a carabiniere who was executed by the Nazis during World War II.

When his singing career started to decline in 1975, Massimo concentrated on his acting career, both in the cinema and, most importantly, as a stage actor: he collaborated with the directors Mauro Bolognini, Giuseppe Patroni Griffi, Giorgio de Lullo, Giorgio Strehler and Maurizio Scaparro, performing a wide range of material from modern plays and musicals, to Molière and Shakespeare.

In 1996, Ranieri provided the speaking and the singing voice of Quasimodo in the Italian-Language version of Disney's The Hunchback of Notre Dame. He even reprised this role in the sequel.

In 2004, he starred in his first French film, a trilogy series called Les Parisiens, where he played a street artist. In 2005, he returned on the stage with the show "Accussì Grande", after a long bout with illness, from which he fully recovered. In 2007, he was in a docu-film called Civico 0, where he played Guilano, a fruit vendor, who becomes homeless after the death of his mother. In 2008, he starred in the film L'Ultimo Pulcinella.

In 2009, he played the storyteller in the play, Polvere di Baghdad, directed by Maurizio Scaparro. 

In 2010, Massimo was featured in Passione, a documentary about the history of music from Naples, Italy, directed by Italian-American actor, John Turturro. In November 2010, he took part in the miniseries remake of the classic play, Filumena Marturano, produced by Italian TV RAI Uno, with Mariangela Melato in the title role. Massimo portrayed Filumena's husband, Domenico Soriano.

Other ventures
On 16 October 2002, Massimo Ranieri was nominated Goodwill Ambassador of the Food and Agriculture Organization of the United Nations (FAO).

Personal life
Ranieri never married. However, in 1971, he fathered a daughter, Cristiana, out of wedlock with Franca Sebastiani. He didn't have anything to do with the raising of his daughter, saying that he was too young and inexperienced for fatherhood, and that it would be damaging to his career. He was never linked with any other woman thereafter. He didn't have any contact with his daughter until they met when she was about 20 years old. 

At the start of 2007, he decided to publicly acknowledge his long-estranged daughter, and embraced her for the first time on live TV. It was a tearful reunion between father and daughter.

He also became a grandfather in July 2011.

Discography

1964 
USA tour with Sergio Bruni
SINGLE: Lassù qualcuno mi ama/Un ragazzo come me (as Gianni Rock)
SINGLE: Preghiera/Una bocca, due occhi e un nome (as Gianni Rock)
SINGLE: Se mi aspetti stasera/La prima volta (as Gianni Rock)
SINGLE: Tanti auguri señora/Non chiudere la porta (as Gianni Rock)
1966
Scala Reale (later called Canzonissima). He sings "L'amore è una cosa meravigliosa" under the art name Ranieri. 
SINGLE: L'amore è una cosa meravigliosa/Bene mio (as Ranieri)
1967
SINGLE: Pietà per chi ti ama/No, mamma (as Ranieri)
1968
 He participated to the Sanremo song competition with I Giganti with the song "Da bambino" 
 Cantagiro with the song "Preghiera per lei".
 SINGLE: Da bambino/Ma l'amore cos'è 
 SINGLE: Preghiera per lei/Cento ragazzine 
 SINGLE: Rose rosse/Piangi piangi ragazzo
1969
 Sanremo with "Quando l'amore diventa poesia" a duet with Orietta Berti
 Cantagiro where he won first prize with "Rose rosse"
 Canzonissima, 2nd place with "Se bruciasse la città"
 SINGLE: Quando l'amore diventa poesia/Cielo blu 
 SINGLE: Il mio amore resta sempre Teresa/Rose rosse )
 SINGLE: Se bruciasse la città/Rita 
 SINGLE: 'O sole mio/Ma l'amore cos'è 
 First LP titled "Massimo Ranieri". 
 Records "Io e te" by Ennio Morricone, the title song from the film 'Metello'.
1970
 Canzonissima, 1st prize with ‘Vent'anni'
 Release of his 2nd LP, titled "Vent'anni". 
 SINGLE: Sei l'amore mio/Fai di me quello che vuoi
 SINGLE: Le braccia dell'amore/Candida 
 SINGLE: Sogno d'amore/Mio caro amore evanescente e puro
 SINGLE: Vent'anni/Io non avrò
1971
 SINGLE: L'amore è un attimo/A Lucia
 SINGLE: Io e te/Adagio veneziano
 SINGLE: Via del Conservatorio/Momento
1972
 'O surdato nammurato' show recorded live (and filmed by RAI TV), at the Sistina Theatre, Rome,  directed by Vittorio De Sica.
 LP 'O surdato nammurato' 
 Canzonissima, 1st place with "Erba di casa mia" 
 LP "Erba di casa mia" 
 SINGLE: 'O surdato 'nnammurato/Lacreme napulitane
 SINGLE: La tua innocenza/Ti ruberei 
 SINGLE: Amore cuore mio/Io di più 
 SINGLE: Erba di casa mia/L'infinito)
1973
 Participates again to Eurofestival with "Chi sarà " .
 LP "Album di famiglia". 
 SINGLE: Chi sarà/Domenica domenica
 SINGLE: Chiove/Reginella 
 SINGLE: Amo ancora lei/Tu sei bella come il sole
1974
 "Napulammore", theatrical musical show directed by Mauro Bolognini at the Teatro Valle in Rome. The show is recorded live and made into an LP, and transmitted by RAI TV
 Canzonissima, 2nd place with "Per una donna"
 LP "Per una donna". 
 SINGLE: Immagina/Se tu fossi una rosa
 SINGLE: 'A tazza 'e cafè/Tu ca nun chiagne
 SINGLE: Te voglio bene assaie/A serenata 'e Pulicenella
 *SINGLE: Per una donna/Cara libertà
1975
 LP Il meglio di Massimo Ranieri (CGD, 69128; antologia)
 LP "Meditazione" with arrangements by Eumir Deodato, with pieces from the classical repertoire. 
 "Macchie ‘e culore", at the Teatro Valle, Rome, directed by Mauro Bolognini – recorded live, made into a live LP and a TV show. 
 SINGLE: Si ricomincia/23, rue des lillas
1976
SINGLE: Dal primo momento che ti ho vista/La mia boheme
1978
LP "La faccia del mare" (The face of the sea), dedicated to Homer's Odyssey.
SINGLE: La faccia del mare/Odyssea 
1981
LP "Passa lu tiempo e lu munno s'avota"   
1983
"Barnum", recording of the musical show with music by Cy Coleman
1988
Return to Sanremo Song Festival, 1st prize with "Perdere l'amore"
LP "Perdere l'amore" 
SINGLE: Perdere l'amore/Dove sta il poeta 
LP of the musical show "Rinaldo in campo".
LP "Un giorno bellissimo" where he sings the theme song of TV show "Fantastico-Cinema"
1989
LP "Da bambino a fantastico" (compilation)
1989
LP "Un giorno bellissimo"
1990
LP "Rose rosse" (compilation)
1990
LP "Vent'anni" (compilation)
1992
 Sanremo "Ti penso" 
 LP "Ti penso" 
 SINGLE: Ti penso/La notte
1995
 Sanremo with "La vestaglia"
 CD "Ranieri". 
 He becomes artistic director of the City of Sorrento Festival.
1997
 Sanremo, with Gianni Togni's ‘Ti parlerò d'amore' 
 CD "Canzoni in corso", a selection of songs by various Italian composers
1999
CD "Hollywood ritratto di un divo" (double CD, from the musical show)
2001
CD "Oggi o dimane" The start of a collaboration with Mauro Pagani and the revisiting of the great classics of Neapolitan song. 
"Oggi o dimane", theatrical tour of the concert show (his first after 25 years)
2003
CD "Nun è acqua" 
"Nun è acqua", concert show and tour
2004
CD "Ranieri canta Napoli" (double CD, with the previous two)
CD "Les Parisiens", soundtrack of the film trilogy, with music by Francis Lai
2005
CD "Accussì grande", 3rd collaboration with Mauro Pagani
"Accussì grande", concert show and tour
2006
CD "Canto perché non so nuotare...da 40 anni"(double CD for his 40 years of singing career)
2007
"Canto perché non so nuotare...da 40 anni!" a nationwide tour which lasted for more than 2 years
"Canto perché non so nuotare...da 40 anni!" live DVD which topped the charts for 27 weeks and became platinum in 2009
2008
CD "Gold Edition Massimo Ranieri" a triple album containing a live with Neapolitan songs, the best of the double CD "Canto perché non so nuotare...da 40 anni!" and the CD "Canzoni in Corso" un omaggio ai cantautori contemporanei. 
2009
CD "Napoli...Viaggio in Italia" (album)
2011
Sanremo, a talking and singing show of reminiscences with Gianni Morandi (you can find parts of it on YouTube)
"Canto perché non so nuotare...da 500 repliche". 500th show
"Threepenny Opera" di Bertolt Brecht".
Recital: "Chi nun tene coraggio nun se cocca ch' 'e femmene belle".
2012
"Raffaele Viviani varietà" directed by Maurizio Scaparro.
2013
"Canto perché non so nuotare...da 500 repliche". 700th show at the Coliseum Theatre in Turin.
 CD "Sogno e Son Desto" Live

Filmography

Films

Television

Theatre (actor)
1976 – "Napoli: chi resta e chi parte" a show comprised by two one-act plays by Raffaele Viviani ("Caffè di notte e giorno" e "Scalo marittimo") directed by Giuseppe Patroni Griffi and shown at the Spoleto "Festival dei due mondi". 
"In memoria di una signora amica" a comedy by Giuseppe Patroni Griffi, directed by Mario Ferrero,with Pupella Maggio and Lilla Brignone.
1977 – "The Waltz of the Dogs" by Leonid N. Andreyev, directed by Giuseppe Patroni Griffi, with Romolo Valli. 
1978 – "The imaginary invalid" by Molière directed by Giorgio De Lullo.
1979 – "Twelfth Night" by Shakespeare, directed by Giorgio De Lullo, with Monica Guerritore
1980 – "The Good Person of Szechwan" by Bertolt Brecht directed by Giorgio Strehler with Andrea Johansson, Renato De Carmine. At the Teatro Comunale di Milano, and then in a European tour which lasted two years. 
1983 – "Barnum", a musical by Mark Bramble directed by Buddy Schwab and Ennio Coltorti, with music by Cy Coleman, with Ottavia Piccolo. 
1986 – "Varietà", directed by Maurizio Scaparro, with Marisa Merlini, Galeazzo Benti and Arturo Brachetti.  
1987 – "Pulcinella" by Manlio Santanelli (taken from a screenplay by Roberto Rossellini), directed by Maurizio Scaparro. 
1988 – "Rinaldo in campo", musical comedy written by Domenico Modugno, directed by Garinei and Giovannini.
1990–91 – "Pulcinella" reprise
1991–92 – "Liolà" by Luigi Pirandello directed by Maurizio Scaparro, with Carlo Croccolo and with original music by Nicola Piovani
1993 – "Teatro Excelsior" directed by Maurizio Scaparro with original music by Antonio Sinagra.
1994 – "L'Île des esclaves" (The Island of Slaves) by Marivaux, directed by Giorgio Strehler, with Pamela Villoresi, Philippe Leroy and Laura Marinoni, music by Fiorenzo Carpi.
1996 – "Le mille e una notte" directed by Maurizio Scaparro, with Laura del Sol. 
1998 – "Hollywood-Ritratto di un divo", musical by Gianni Togni e Guido Morra, on the love between John Gilbert and Greta Garbo directed by Giuseppe Patroni Griffi
2000 – "Il Grande Campione", by Maurizio Fabrizio and Guido Morra, directed by Giuseppe Patroni Griffi, the love story between the boxer Marcel Cerdan and Edith Piaf 
2007 – He is the narrator voice in "Peter and the Wolf" in a concert with the Solisti Veneti, conducted by Claudio Scimone.
2009 – "Polvere di Baghdad" directed by Maurizio Scaparro, his goodbye production as head of the Theatre Sector of the Venice Biennale. Written by Scaparro, together with the poet Adonis and journalist Massimo Nava, it links today's Baghdad with its mythical status as the locus of the 2001 Nights. Ranieri is a storyteller who, from the distant past, is catapulted into today's ruined city.

Directing (Theatre and Opera)
2004 – "Cavalleria Rusticana" opera by Pietro Mascagni and "I Pagliacci"  by Ruggero Leoncavallo at the Opera Arena Sferisterio in the city of Macerata.  
2005 – "L'Elisir d'amore" opera by Donizetti at the Teatro di San Carlo of Naples. 
2006 – "La Traviata" opera by Giuseppe Verdi al Teatro Verdi di Trieste conducted by Daniel Oren.
2007 – "La Traviata" at the Tirana National Opera House and at the Teatro di San Carlo in Naples. 
2008 – "La Cenerentola" opera by Gioacchino Rossini at the Teatro Verdi in Teramo
"Poveri ma belli" a musical taken from the film by Dino Risi, with music by Gianni Togni. With Bianca Guaccero, Antonello Angiolillo and Michele Carfora. 
2009 – "Versi e diversi", a new show written in collaboration with Gualtiero Peirce, at the Ravello Festival.

Books 
2007 – "Mia madre non-voleva" (with Gualtiero Peirce, published by Rizzoli), autobiography
2021 – "Tutti i sogni ancora in volo" (published by Rizzoli), autobiography

Awards 
1970 – "David di Donatello" and "Premio Internazionale della Critica" awards for "Metello".
1972 – National prize "I numeri 1", Radio Montecarlo Prize for popularity. 
1973 – Telegatto "Vota la voce" (Rank the voice) as Best male singer.
1984 – "Positano Top" award for "Barnum".
1974 – "Gran simpatico" prize .
1987 – Taormina Arte Award.
1999 – Ennio Flaiano Award for the Theatre
2005 – Premio Barocco and the Premio Sirmione Catullo as Artist of the Year
Premio Nuova Spoleto per L'Arte e lo Spettacolo. 
2008 – De Sica Award for the Theatre, presented by the President of the Republic Mr. Napolitano.
"Volere Volare, Il meglio del Made in Italy" award, as public person of the year 
"La Pigna d'oro" award for his whole career. 
2009 – Burlamacco d'Oro".   
Special Jury Prize of the Festival of Busto Arsizio for the film "L'ultimo Pulcinella" which also was awarded the Best Director prize.
Premio Flaiano (2nd time).

References 

 FAO Goodwill Ambassador website

External links 

Official homepage
Synopsis of "La vela incantata"
Review of "Pulcinella" film 
Polvere di Baghdad
Short biography

 
 

 

  

1951 births
Living people
Musicians from Naples
Italian pop singers
Italian male stage actors
Italian male film actors
Italian male television actors
Italian male voice actors
Eurovision Song Contest entrants for Italy
Eurovision Song Contest entrants of 1971
Eurovision Song Contest entrants of 1973
Sanremo Music Festival winners
David di Donatello winners
20th-century Italian male singers
21st-century Italian male singers
20th-century Italian male actors
21st-century Italian male actors